Renzo Morigi (28 February 1895 – 13 April 1962) was an Italian pistol sports shooter who competed in the 1932 Summer Olympics. In 1932, he won the gold medal in the 25 metre rapid fire pistol event.

Personal life
Morigi served in the Italian Army in World War I, and joined the National Fascist Party in 1921. Morigi led Squadristi actions through Emilia.

References

External links
 profile

1895 births
1962 deaths
Sportspeople from Ravenna
Deputies of Legislature XXIX of the Kingdom of Italy
Members of the Chamber of Fasces and Corporations
People of the Italian Social Republic
Italian male sport shooters
Olympic shooters of Italy
Shooters at the 1932 Summer Olympics
Olympic gold medalists for Italy
ISSF pistol shooters
Olympic medalists in shooting
Medalists at the 1932 Summer Olympics
Italian military personnel of World War I